Tsvetkovka is a rural locality (a selo) and the administrative centre of Tsvetkovsky Selsoviet, Kizlyarsky District, Republic of Dagestan, Russia. The population was 3,767 as of 2010. There are 24 streets.

Geography 
Tsvetkovka is located 16 km northeast of Kizlyar (the district's administrative centre) by road. Khutseyevka and Dalneye are the nearest rural localities.

Nationalities 
Avars, Chechens and Dargins live there.

References 

Rural localities in Kizlyarsky District